Cathole Mountain, is the lowest peak in the trap rock Hanging Hills of Meriden, Connecticut. The mountain is separated from South Mountain by the narrow, rocky Cathole Pass through which Connecticut Route 71 ascends. 

The mountain consists of two prominences, the southern ledges  and the main peak one mile to the north. The 51 mile Metacomet Trail crosses Cathole Mountain and offers views of Cathole Pass. The cliffs continue south with views over Meriden, but there is no official trail that runs the length of them. Activities enjoyed on the peak include hiking, rock climbing, and in the winter, snowshoeing. 

Much of the northern half of the mountain is privately owned.

Adjacent summits

See also
Metacomet Ridge
Mattabesett Trail

References

 Connecticut Walk Book  17th ed. Connecticut Forest and Park Association.

External links
 The City of Meriden

Meriden, Connecticut
Hanging Hills
Mountains of Connecticut
Tourist attractions in New Haven County, Connecticut
Landforms of New Haven County, Connecticut